Kloten is a railway station in the Swiss canton of Zurich and municipality of Kloten. The station is located on the Zurich to Winterthur line and is an intermediate stop on Zurich S-Bahn line S7.

Although the station is situated only  from the main terminal of Zurich Airport, it has been bypassed by the opening, in 1980, of a new line directly serving the Zürich Airport railway station in the basement of that terminal. Kloten is now only visited by the S7 and freight trains, while all other passenger trains on the line serve
the airport.

Layout and facilities 
Kloten consists of a single island platform providing access to tracks 3 and 4. Trains to  use track 3, while trains to Zürich use track 4. No platforms serve tracks 1 and 2. 

The main entrance and station building is located on Lindenstrasse on the north side of the tracks. On the south side is a car and bicycle parking lot on Breitistrasse. A pedestrian tunnel runs between Lindenstrasse and Breitistrasse, connecting the platform with the station building and parking lot. Bus routes 732, 733, 735, and 766 stop at the entrance on Lindenstrasse; buses 731 and 736 stop on Breitistrasse.

References

External links 

Kloten station on Swiss Federal Railway's web site

Kloten
Kloten